Oxalis rubens is a small herbaceous plant found in coastal areas of Australia and New Zealand. Branches are erect or ascending, up to 35 cm long, of a dull red-brown colour. The specific epithet rubens is derived from Latin, meaning reddish in colour.

References

rubens
Plants described in 1803
Flora of New South Wales
Flora of Victoria (Australia)
Flora of Queensland
Flora of Tasmania
Flora of South Australia
Flora of New Zealand
Flora of Lord Howe Island
Flora of Norfolk Island